Attorney General Gibson may refer to:

Allyson Maynard Gibson (born 1957), Attorney General of the Bahamas
Ben Gibson (politician) (1882–1949), Attorney General of Iowa
Charles E. Gibson Jr. (1925–2017), Attorney General of Vermont
John George Gibson (1846–1923), Attorney-General for Ireland
John Morison Gibson (1842–1929), Attorney General of Ontario
Leslie Gibson (judge) (1896–1952), Attorney General of Palestine
Walter M. Gibson (1822–1888), Acting Attorney General of Kingdom of Hawaii

See also
General Gibson (disambiguation)